Having a Party may refer to:

Having a Party (Chips album), 1982
Having a Party (Pointer Sisters album), 1977
"Having a Party" (Sam Cooke song), 1962
"Having a Party" (The Osmonds song), 1975